Birdsville is a town in Australia.

Birdsville or Birdville may also refer to:
Birdsville, Georgia
Birdsville, Maryland
Birdville, Texas